Kamran Najafzadeh (also written as Kamran Najaf Zadeh) is an Iranian presenter who works for the Islamic Republic of Iran Broadcasting. He is known for founding IRIB 20:30 show. Currently, he lives in Guttenberg, New Jersey.

Early life
Kamran Najafzadeh was born on 19 May 1979 in Tehran’s Sattarkhan neighborhood. He is married and has one son. He has a bachelors degree in Genetic Engineering and a masters degree in Theater.

Career

Prior to entering Iranian television, Kamran Najafzadeh was a journalist at a number of newspapers including Arman and Keyhan Sports.

On 26 March 2011, Najafzadeh was expelled from France. While the French government never released a public statement about this event his hiring agency, Islamic Republic of Iran Broadcasting, claimed it was because: “the French Ministers of the Interior and Foreign Affairs decided, during a meeting, that “the IRIBNews reporter had crossed the yellow line and stirred up hatred in public opinion French public”.

Kamran Najafzadeh was the founder and first host of the IRIB 20:30 show. This show is being accused of producing and publishing forced confessions, misinformation campaigns, and propagating Islamic Republic propaganda, so that it’s staff are commonly called as interrogator-journalists.

Only one day from the release of Jason Rezaian from the Evin Prison by Iranian authorities, on 16 January 2016, Najafzadeh's visa was issued by the United States government. This raised speculation on a potential agreement behind the scene between the Iranian Government and Obama administration. Najafzadeh has a C2 single entry visa to the United States and can't move further than 25 miles from the Headquarters of the United Nations in New York City.

Rape, Torture, and Murder of Taraneh Mousavi 
On 2009 and after the green movement a story of a young woman being captured, raped and, tortured shocked the country. These news were later confirmed by one of the opposition leaders, that the head of IGRC information organization, Mr. Hossein Taeb, raped and killed Ms. Taraneh Mousavi in custody.

To fight the widely spread news, Mr. Najafzadeh produced and aired a program in which he claimed there were only three people with that name being registered in civil registry records in Iran and Taraneh Mousavi is a fictional characters. Mr Najafzadeh’s claims strongly refuted a few days later by finding at least two other famous Iranians with the same name

Relationships with Shia Militia

In addition to airing the misinformation campaign for Mr. Hossein Taeb, the head of IGRC information organization, Najaf Zadeh has close relationships with other Shia Militia figures. In a rare media appearance of Qasem Soleimani, the deceased head of IGRC Quds Force, Kamran Najafzadeh was the host. This meeting was later canceled due to the security concerns. Right after the death of Islamic Revolutionary Guard Corps general Qasem Soleimani, Najafzadeh published a few posts in his support.

Moreover, he is the only foreign correspondence who ever interviews Hassan Nasrallah, a Lebanese cleric and Secretary-General of Hezbollah Hezbollah is recognized as a terrorist organization in the United States, and European Union.

Reactions to interviews

He did a short one-liner interview with Lionel Messi during the time he was in France. He was registered as a candidate for Iran’s parliament.

References

Islamic Azad University alumni
People from Tehran
Iranian journalists
1978 births
Living people
Iranian television news anchors
Iranian radio and television presenters